Macaca jiangchuanensis is a prehistoric macaque from the early Pleistocene of China.

References

M
Prehistoric monkeys
Quaternary mammals of Asia
Pleistocene primates
Fossil taxa described in 1992